Abraham van Heyden or van Heiden ( or ; 1597–1678) was a Dutch Calvinist minister and controversialist, sympathetic to Cartesianism.

Life
He was born in Frankenthal in the Palatinate, son of Gaspar van der Heiden the Younger, a Reformed minister and Counter-Remonstrant who moved to Amsterdam in 1608. Abraham studied theology at the University of Leiden from 1617, travelled to Heidelberg, Geneva and Paris, and was influenced by Ramism and Jean Daillé. He returned to an appointment as minister in Naarden in 1623, moving to Leiden in 1627.

In 1648 Heidanus was appointed professor of theology at the University of Leiden. In 1650 he invited Johannes Cocceius to join him on the faculty there. Battle lines were being drawn up for an extended series of controversies, in which Gisbertus Voetius of Utrecht took the other side.

In 1655 Johannes Hoornbeeck contributed to the debate between Voetians and Cocceians a sabbatarian pamphlet. Heidanus wrote De Sabbate (1658 in Latin, later in Dutch) in reply; Andreas Essenius attacked Heidanus, and Cocceius became drawn in, to what became a long controversy.

The position Heidanus held for decades as leader of Leiden Cartesianism eventually led to his dismissal by the university in 1676. This happened after he with Burchard de Volder and Christophorus Wittichius published a rebuttal of the university's condemnation of Cartesian and Cocceian views.

References

Citations

Bibliography
Jonathan I. Israel (1995) The Dutch Republic. Its Rise, Greatness, and Fall, 1477-1806.

External links
Old Dictionary article

1597 births
1678 deaths
17th-century Dutch Calvinist and Reformed ministers
Leiden University alumni
Academic staff of Leiden University
People from Frankenthal